M1942 may refer to:
 M1942 bayonet for the M1 Garand battle rifle of the United States Army
 M1942 Liberator (FP-45), World War II single shot pistol for partisans
 76 mm divisional gun M1942 (ZiS-3)
 45 mm anti-tank gun M1942 (M-42)
 M-1942 Paratrooper uniform
 M1942 machete
 M1942 bolo knife

See also
 M42 (disambiguation)